Heinrich "Heinz" Schmalix (24 July 1910 – 30 November 1974) was a German field hockey player who competed in the 1936 Summer Olympics. He was a member of the German field hockey team, which won the silver medal. He played three matches as halfback.

External links
 
Heinz Schmalix's profile at databaseOlympics
Heinz Schmalix's profile at the International Olympic Committee

1910 births
1974 deaths
German male field hockey players
Olympic field hockey players of Germany
Field hockey players at the 1936 Summer Olympics
Olympic silver medalists for Germany
Olympic medalists in field hockey
Medalists at the 1936 Summer Olympics